Macro photography (or photomacrography or macrography, and sometimes macrophotography) is extreme close-up photography, usually of very small subjects and living organisms like insects, in which the size of the subject in the photograph is greater than life size (though macrophotography also refers to the art of making very large photographs).
By the original definition, a macro photograph is one in which the size of the subject on the negative or image sensor is life size or greater. In some senses, however, it refers to a finished photograph of a subject that is greater than life size.

The ratio of the subject size on the film plane (or sensor plane) to the actual subject size is known as the reproduction ratio. Likewise, a macro lens is classically a lens capable of reproduction ratios of at least 1:1, although it often refers to any lens with a large reproduction ratio, despite rarely exceeding 1:1.

Apart from technical photography and film-based processes, where the size of the image on the negative or image sensor is the subject of discussion, the finished print or on-screen image more commonly lends a photograph its macro status. For example, when producing a 6×4-inch (15×10-cm) print using 35 format (36×24 mm) film or sensor, a life-size result is possible with a lens having only a 1:4 reproduction ratio.

Reproduction ratios much greater than 10:1 are considered to be photomicrography, often achieved with digital microscope (photomicrography should not be confused with microphotography, the art of making very small photographs, such as for microforms).

Due to advances in sensor technology, today's small-sensor digital cameras can rival the macro capabilities of a DSLR with a "true" macro lens, despite having a lower reproduction ratio, making macro photography more widely accessible at a lower cost. In the digital age, a "true" macro photograph can be more practically defined as a photograph with a vertical subject height of 24 mm or less.

History 
The term photo-macrograph was proposed in 1899 by W. H. Walmsley for close-up images with less than 10 diameters magnification, to distinguish from true photo-micrographs.

Development of the photo-micrograph led to the evolution of macro photography.

One of the earliest pioneers of macro photography was Percy Smith, born in 1880. He was a British nature documentary filmmaker, and was known for his close-up photographs.

Equipment and techniques 

"Macro" lenses specifically designed for close-up work, with a long barrel for close focusing and optimized for high reproduction ratios, are one of the most common tools for macro photography. (Unlike most other lens makers, Nikon designates its macro lenses as "Micro" because of their original use in making microform.) Most modern macro lenses can focus continuously to infinity as well and can provide excellent optical quality for normal photography. True macro lenses, such as the Canon MP-E 65mm f/2.8 1-5x Macro,  Laowa 25mm f/2.8 2.5-5X Ultra Macro (a relatively shorter focal length) or Minolta AF 3x-1x 1.7-2.8 Macro, can achieve higher magnification than life size, enabling photography of the structure of small insect eyes, snowflakes, and other minuscule objects. Others, such as the Infinity Photo-Optical's TS-160 can achieve magnifications from 0-18x on sensor, focusing from infinity down to 18 mm from the object.

Macro lenses of different focal lengths find different uses:
 Continuously-variable focal lengthsuitable for virtually all macro subjects
 45–65 mmproduct photography, small objects that can be approached closely without causing undesirable influence, and scenes requiring natural background perspective
 90–105 mminsects, flowers, and small objects from a comfortable distance
 150–200 mminsects and other small animals where additional working distance is required

Extending the distance between the lens and the film or sensor, by inserting either extension tubes or a continuously adjustable bellows, is another equipment option for macro photography. The further the lens is from the film or sensor, the closer the focusing distance, the greater the magnification, and the darker the image given the same aperture. Tubes of various lengths can be stacked, decreasing lens-to-subject distance and increasing magnification. Bellows or tubes shorten the available maximum focus distance and make it impossible to focus to infinity.

Placing an auxiliary close-up lens (or close-up "filter") in front of the camera's lens is another option. Inexpensive screw-in or slip-on attachments provide close focusing. The possible quality is less than that of a dedicated macro lens or extension tubes, with some two-element versions being very good while many inexpensive single element lenses exhibit chromatic aberration and reduced sharpness of the resulting image. This method works with cameras that have fixed lenses, and is commonly used with bridge cameras. These lenses add diopters to the optical power of the lens, decreasing the minimum focusing distance, and allowing the camera to get closer to the subject. They are typically designated by their diopter, and can be stacked (with an additional loss of quality) to achieve the desired magnification.

Photographers may employ view camera movements and the Scheimpflug principle to place an object close to the lens in focus, while maintaining selective background focus. This technique requires the use of a view camera or perspective control lens with the ability to tilt the lens with respect to the film or sensor plane. Lenses such as the Nikon PC-E and Canon TS-E series, the Hartblei Super-Rotator, the Schneider Super Angulon, several Lensbaby models, the Zoerk Multi Focus System, and various tilt-shift adapters for medium format, allow the use of tilt in cameras with fixed lens mounts. Traditional view cameras permit such adjustment as part of their design.

Ordinary lenses can be used for macro photography by using a "reversing ring". This ring attaches to the filter thread on the front of a lens and makes it possible to attach the lens in reverse. Excellent quality results up to 4x life-size magnification are possible. For cameras with all-electronic communications between the lens and the camera body specialty reversing rings are available which preserve these communications. When used with extension tubes or bellows, a highly versatile, true macro (greater than life size) system can be assembled. Since non-macro lenses are optimized for small reproduction ratios, reversing the lens allows it to be used for reciprocally high ratios.

Macro photography may also be accomplished by mounting a lens in reverse, in front of a normally mounted lens of greater focal length, using a macro coupler which screws into the front filter threads of both lenses. This method allows most cameras to maintain the full function of electronic and mechanical communication with the normally mounted lens, for features such as open-aperture metering. The magnification ratio is calculated by dividing the focal length of the normally mounted lens by the focal length of the reversed lens (e.g., when an 18 mm lens is reverse mounted on a 300 mm lens the reproduction ratio is 16:1). The use of automatic focus is not advisable if the first lens is not of the internal-focusing type, as the extra weight of the reverse-mounted lens could damage the autofocus mechanism. Working distance is significantly less than the first lens.

Increasingly, macro photography is accomplished using compact digital cameras and small-sensor bridge cameras, combined with a high powered zoom lens and (optionally) a close-up diopter lens added to the front of the camera lens. The deep depth of field of these cameras is an advantage for macro work.  The high pixel density and resolving power of these cameras' sensors enable them to capture very high levels of detail at a lower reproduction ratio than is needed for film or larger DSLR sensors (often at the cost of greater image noise). Despite the fact that many of these cameras come with a "macro mode" which does not qualify as true macro, some photographers are using the advantages of small sensor cameras to create macro images that rival or even surpass those from DSLRs.

Macro photography can also be carried out by attaching a camera to one optical path of a binocular microscope (stereo microscope), making use of the optics of that instrument as the imaging lens for the system. Between approximately 1976 and 1993, the manufacturers Wild Heerbrugg (Switzerland) and subsequently, Leica Microsystems offered a dedicated microscopy system for macro photography, the macroscope line, with improved optical performance for photography at the expense of the stereo imaging facility of the stereo microscope; this system came with a range of dedicated stands, objective and supplementary lenses, and illumination systems. Following its discontinuation in 1993, Leica continues to offer similar products under the names Z6 APO and Z16 APO.
The iPhone 13 Pro series introduced macro photography in the iPhone camera, as well as Samsung Galaxy S21 Ultra, which is also introduced a macro photography in the smartphone camera.

Macro photography techniques

35 mm equivalent magnification 

35 mm equivalent magnification, or 35 mm equivalent reproduction ratio, is a measure that indicates the apparent magnification achieved with a small sensor format, or "crop sensor" digital camera compared to a 35 mm-based image enlarged to the same print size. The term is useful because many photographers are familiar with the 35 mm film format.

While a "true" macro lens is defined as a lens having a reproduction ratio of 1:1 on the film or sensor plane, with small sensor format digital cameras an actual reproduction ratio of 1:1 is rarely achieved or needed to take macro photographs. What macro photographers often care about more is simply knowing the size of the smallest object that can fill the frame. To put it simply, 1X magnification means: if the object is 1mm long, it would be exactly 1mm long when projected to the sensor. Let's say you are shooting 1X magnification with a full-frame camera (36X24mm), an object with the size 18x12mm would take 1/4 area of your photo. For example, the 12 megapixel Micro Four Thirds Panasonic Lumix DMC-GH1 camera with a 2x crop sensor only requires a 1:2 reproduction ratio to take a picture with the same subject size, resolution, and apparent magnification as a 12 megapixel "full-frame" Nikon D700 camera, when the images are viewed on screen or printed at the same size. Thus a Four Thirds system macro lens like the Laowa 50mm f/2.8 2X Ultra Macro Lens with a maximum image magnification of 2.0x is rated as having a "4.0x 35 mm equivalent magnification".

To calculate 35 mm equivalent reproduction ratio, simply multiply the actual maximum magnification of the lens by the 35 mm conversion factor, or "crop factor" of the camera. If the actual magnification and/or crop factor are unknown (such as is the case with many compact or point-and-shoot digital cameras), simply take a photograph of a mm ruler placed vertically in the frame focused at the maximum magnification distance of the lens and measure the height of the frame. Since the object height of a 1.0x magnified 35 mm film image is 24 mm, calculate 35 mm equivalent reproduction ratio and true reproduction ratio by using the following:

(35 mm equivalent reproduction ratio) = 24 / (measured height in mm)

(True reproduction ratio) = (35 mm equivalent reproduction ratio) / Crop factor.

Since digital compact camera sensor sizes come in a wide diversity of sizes and camera manufacturers rarely publish the macro reproduction ratios for these cameras, a good rule of thumb is that whenever a 24 mm vertical object just fits, or is too tall to fit in the camera viewfinder, you are taking a macro photograph.

Technical considerations

Depth of field 

Limited depth of field is an important consideration in macro photography. Depth of field is extremely small when focusing on close objects. A small aperture (high f-number) is often required to produce acceptable sharpness across a three-dimensional subject. This requires either a slow shutter speed, brilliant lighting, or a high ISO. Auxiliary lighting (such as from a flash unit), preferably a ring flash is often used (see Lighting section).

Like conventional lenses, macro lenses need light, and ideally would provide similar # to conventional lenses to provide similar exposure times. Macro lenses also have similar focal lengths, so the entrance pupil diameter is comparable to that of conventional lenses (e.g., a 100 mm 2.8 lens has a 100 mm/2.8 = 35.7 mm entrance-pupil diameter). Because they focus at close subjects, the cone of light from a subject point to the entrance pupil is relatively obtuse (a relatively high subject numerical aperture, to use a microscopy term), making the depth of field extraordinarily small. This makes it essential to focus critically on the most important part of the subject, as elements that are even a millimetre closer or farther from the focal plane might be noticeably blurred. Due to this, the use of a microscope stage is highly recommended for precise focus with large magnification, for example when photographing skin cells. Alternatively, more shots of the same subject can be made with slightly different focusing lengths and joined afterwards with specialized focus stacking software which picks out the sharpest parts of every image, artificially increasing the perceived depth of field of the resulting image.

Lighting 
The problem of sufficiently and evenly lighting the subject can be difficult to overcome. Some cameras can focus on subjects so close that they touch the front of the lens. It is difficult to place a light between the camera and a subject that close, making extreme close-up photography impractical. A normal-focal-length macro lens (50 mm on a 35 mm camera) can focus so close that lighting remains difficult. To avoid this problem, many photographers use telephoto macro lenses, typically with focal lengths from about 100 to 200 mm. These are popular as they permit sufficient distance for lighting between the camera and the subject.

Ring flashes, with flash tubes arranged in a circle around the front of the lens, can be helpful in lighting at close distances.  Ring lights have emerged, using white LEDs to provide a continuous light source for macro photography, however they are not as bright as a ring flash and the white balance is very cool.

Good results can also be obtained by using a flash diffuser. Homemade flash diffusers made out of white Styrofoam or plastic attached to a camera's built-in flash can also yield surprisingly good results by diffusing and softening the light, eliminating specular reflections and providing more even lighting.

Chromatic aberration 
Many macro lenses are characterised by a high amount of chromatic aberration, especially when using reversed-lens, extension tube or close-up lens. Some macro lenses, called apochromatic lenses, are designed to better control this, such as the Laowa 100mm f/2.8 2x Ultra Macro APO and the Sigma APO MACRO 150mm F2.8.

See also 
 Forensic photography
 Macroscope (Wild-Leica)
 Micrograph
 Time-lapse photography

References

External links 

Photography by genre
Photographic techniques